Nationalist Party may refer to:

Current parties
 Bangladesh Nationalist Party
 Basque Nationalist Party
 Cornish Nationalist Party
 Nacionalista Party (Philippines)
 Nationalist Movement Party (Turkey)
 Nationalist Party of Canada
 Nationalist Party of China, another name for the Kuomintang (Taiwan)
 Nationalist Party (Malta)
 Puerto Rican Nationalist Party

Defunct parties
 Nationalist Party (Australia)
 Nationalist Party (Bolivia)
 Nationalist Party of Bulgaria
 Nationalist Party (Burma)
 Nationalist Party of Cantabria
 Nationalist Party of Castile and León
 Nationalist Party of Greater Vietnam
 Nationalist Party (Greece)
 Nationalist Party (Iceland)
 Nationalist Party (Ireland)
 Nationalist Party (Ivory Coast)
 Nationalist Party (Northern Ireland)
 Nationalist Party (Panama)
 Nationalist Party (Peru)
 Nationalist Party of Peru (Eguiguren)
 Nationalist Party of Peru (Revilla)
 Nationalist Party (Quebec)
 Nationalist Party of the Rif of Melilla
 Nationalist Party (Solomon Islands)
 Nationalist Party (Thailand)
 Nationalist Party of the Valencian Country

See also
 National Party (disambiguation)